Atmosfear may refer to:
 Atmosfear (series), an Australian horror video board game series launched in 1991
 Atmosfear (band), a British jazz funk band formed in 1979.
 AtmosFear (Liseberg), an amusement park ride which opened in Gothenburg, Sweden, in 2011
 AtmosFEAR (Morey's Piers), an amusement park ride which opened in New Jersey, US, in 2005
 AtmosFear, the engine used for the Carnivores game series and other titles by Ukrainian video game developer Action Forms